Plastocerus is a genus of click beetles, the sole member of the subfamily Plastocerinae; while it has historically often been ranked as a family, the genus is now placed firmly within the family Elateridae.

Species
Plastocerus angulosus (Germar, 1844)
Plastocerus thoracicus Fleutiaux, 1918

References

Elateridae